Saint-Jean-de-Sixt is a commune in the Haute-Savoie department in the Auvergne-Rhône-Alpes region in southeastern France.

It lies in the Aravis Range of the French Alps. The inhabitants are the Saintjeandais or Saintjeandins.

The village used to be called Villaret, when it was a part of the Kingdom of Savoy, prior to its incorporation into France in 1860.

Nearby
Nearby villages include Manigod, Thônes, Le Grand Bornand, La Clusaz and the larger Chamonix and Annecy.

Notable inhabitants
 Saint Peter Faber, S.J., one of the founders of the Jesuit Order, was born here.

See also
Communes of the Haute-Savoie department
 first bungee jump off a ramp in the word : Bun J Ride

References

External links

 Saint-Jean-de-Sixt

Communes of Haute-Savoie